Villalmarzo is one of eight parishes (administrative divisions) in the El Franco municipality, within the province and autonomous community of Asturias, in northern Spain. 

The population is 138 (INE 2007).

Villages and hamlets
 El Llourdal
 Lludeiros
 San Xuyán
 Villalmarzo
 El Chao
 El Mayorazo
 Riocaballos
 Samarfún

References

Parishes in El Franco